Terminal Terror is the fifth full-length album release by the German thrash metal band Holy Moses.

Track listing

Holy Moses albums
1991 albums